13th Children of Krakow Infantry Regiment (Polish language: 13 Pulk Piechoty Dzieci Krakowa, 13 pp) was an infantry regiment of the Polish Army. It existed from 1918 until 1939. Garrisoned first in Krakow, then in Krzemieniec and in 1921 - 1939 in Pultusk, the unit belonged to the 8th Infantry Division from Modlin.

Beginnings  
The regiment was formed on November 7, 1918, in the village of Madefalda, located in Hungarian Transilvania. On that day, soldiers of the Austro-Hungarian 13th Infantry Regiment, which consisted mostly of ethnic Poles (80%), decided to turn their unit into the 13th Polish Infantry Regiment. 

On November 13, the unit reached Krakow by rail, without its weapons and food, which had been taken from them by the Czechs and the Hungarians. At the same time, reserve battalion of the Austro-Hungarian 13th Infantry Regiment, stationed in Olomouc, also pledged its allegiance to the newly restored Poland, and brought to Krakow its money, weapons, ammunition and uniforms. 

Following the order of the Polish Military Command of Krakow (Polska Komenda Wojskowa), the 8th Infantry Regiment, consisting of Poles who had served in Austro-Hungarian forces, was formed in mid-November 1918. The new unit took the barracks of King Jan III Sobieski, and pledged allegiance to Poland in late November in Wawel Castle. On February 8, 1919, the regiment, renamed into the 13th Infantry Regiment, was sent to Lwow, to fight in the Polish-Ukrainian War.

Wars of 1919 - 1921  
During the Polish-Soviet War, the regiment, which belonged to the 8th Infantry Division, was part of the XV Infantry Brigade. On August 14, 1920, it attacked Soviet positions near Ossow (see Battle of Ossow). 

On September 16, 1920, the regiment, commanded by Captain Jan Gabrys, fought in the Battle of Dytiatyn, known in Polish as Thermopylae. Out of approximately 200 soldiers who defended Hill 385, 97 were killed, and another 86 were wounded. In 1930, a church monument was built in the location of the tomb of the soldiers of the regiment. The church was destroyed by Soviet authorities after 1945.

Second Polish Republic  
After the war, the regiment was briefly stationed in Lubar, to be transferred to Krzemieniec, on December 2, 1920. In March 1921, it was moved to its permanent location at Pultusk. During the 1926 May Coup (Poland), it supported the forces of Jozef Pilsudski. 

Mobilized in August 1939, the regiment was part of its 8th Infantry Division, Modlin Army, and initially fought in the area of Pultusk.

Commandants  
 Colonel Boleslaw Kraupa 1918 – 1920, 
 Colonel Karol Krauss 1920, 
 Captain Jan Józef Rój 1920, 
 Colonel Krukowski 1920, 
 Captain Emil Prochaska 1920, 
 Captain Jan Rudolf Gabrys 1920, 
 Colonel Czeslaw Mlot-Fijalkowski 1920 – 1926, 
 Colonel Florian Smykal 1926 – 1929, 
 Colonel Jan Zietarski 1929 – 1935, 
 Colonel Jozef Kobylecki 1935 – 1938, 
 Colonel Alojzy Nowak 1938 – KIA 24.9.1939, 
 Major Wiktoryn Gieruszczak WIA 24.9.1939, 
 Colonel Marian Adam Markiewicz 25-29.9.1939

Symbols  
The flag, funded by the residents of the Counties of Pultusk and Makow Mazowiecki, was handed to the regiment on November 3, 1923 in Pultusk, by President Stanislaw Wojciechowski. 

The badge was approved in October 1928. It was in the shape of the cross, with a silver Polish Eagle, and the inscription 13 PP.

Sources 
 Kazimierz Satora: Opowieści wrześniowych sztandarów. Warszawa: Instytut Wydawniczy Pax, 1990
 Zdzisław Jagiełło: Piechota Wojska Polskiego 1918-1939. Warszawa: Bellona, 2007

See also 
 1939 Infantry Regiment (Poland)

13th Infantry Regiment (Poland)
Military units and formations established in 1918
Military units and formations disestablished in 1939
Military units and formations of Poland in World War II
Polish Legions in World War I